Cymbopogon elegans is a grass species in the genus Cymbopogon.

References

elegans
Plants described in 1815